The 2019 season was the Geelong Football Club's 120th in the Australian Football League (AFL). It was the ninth season under senior coach Chris Scott, with Joel Selwood appointed as club captain for an eight successive year. Geelong (known as the Cats) participated in the 2019 JLT Community Series as part of their pre-season schedule, and the club's regular season began on 22 March against Collingwood at the Melbourne Cricket Ground (MCG). The Cats finished the home-and-away season with a 16–6 win–loss record and placed first on the league's ladder, earning Geelong their first minor premiership since the 2008 season. Progressing to the third week of the 2019 finals series, Geelong was subsequently defeated in a preliminary final against Richmond by 19 points, eliminating them before the 2019 AFL Grand Final.

Patrick Dangerfield was named Geelong's best and fairest player, polling 268 votes for the Carji Greeves Medal ahead of second-placed Tim Kelly on 259.5 votes. It was Dangerfield's third Carji Greeves Medal, having previously won the award the 2016 and 2017 seasons. Tom Hawkins was the club's leading goalkicker for the eighth successive season, scoring 56 goals. Dangerfield, Kelly and Hawkins were all selected in the 2019 All-Australian team, alongside Geelong teammate Tom Stewart. Kelly also received the AFL Coaches Association's Best Young Player award. The Cats also fielded a reserves team in the Victorian Football League (VFL), where they were defeated in an elimination final by Port Melbourne.

Background 

Chris Scott continued as the club's senior coach for a ninth season, after signing a contract in August 2018 extending his tenure until the end of the 2022 season. The Cats had four assistant coaches this season, each responsible for specific positions within games: James Rahilly (forward line), Matthew Knights and Nigel Lappin (midfield), Matthew Scarlett (back line). Corey Enright was also a member of the coaching panel, fulfilling the role of development coach for Geelong's young players.

Joel Selwood was appointed the club's captain for an eighth successive season, with Patrick Dangerfield and Harry Taylor sharing the role of vice-captain. They were supported by a leadership group made up by teammates  Mark Blicavs, Mitch Duncan and Zach Tuohy, who all remained in the group from the prior season, along with new addition Tom Stewart.

Ford Australia was the major sponsor of the club for the 2019 season, continuing a long-running deal that started in 1925. GMHBA was the naming rights sponsor for Geelong's home ground Kardinia Park, continuing a ten-year deal signed in October 2017 for the venue to be known as GMHBA Stadium. The Cats were scheduled to play nine of their eleven home games at GMHBA Stadium for the season's home-and-away fixture; the Melbourne Cricket Ground (MCG) hosted the club's remaining two home games against Essendon and Hawthorn. Geelong signed up 65,063 members and had an average home ground attendance of 33,405 spectators across the season.

Playing list

Changes 
At the end of the 2018 season, Geelong delisted Aaron Black, Ryan Gardner, Cory Gregson, Daniel Menzel and Jordan Murdoch and Timm House from their primary list; the club also removed Stewart Crameri and Matthew Hayball from their rookie list. Menzel and Murdoch were later recruited by Sydney and Gold Coast respectively as delisted free agents. Conversely, rookies Jack Henry and Mark O'Connor were both upgraded to the Cats' senior list for 2019.

Geelong were involved in six trades during the annual trade period, the first of which involved the Cats exchanging Lincoln McCarthy (along with picks 55 and 59 in the upcoming national draft) to Brisbane for picks 43 and 62. Geelong used these picks to secure Nathan Kreuger from Carlton and Gary Rohan from Sydney respectively. The club then traded George Horlin-Smith to Gold Coast for pick 59, and Jackson Thurlow to Sydney for pick 70; pick 59 was later on-traded (along with pick 60) to Collingwood in return for pick 51. Additionally, Luke Dahlhaus joined the club as an unrestricted free agent.

Six players were drafted by the Cats in the 2018 national draft: Jordan Clark (pick 15), Ben Jarvis (48), Jacob Kennerley (50), Darcy Fort (65), Jake Tarca (68) and Oscar Brownless (74)—a father–son selection. Geelong also selected Tom Atkins (pick 11) in the rookie draft; Atkins had been playing with the club's Victorian Football League (VFL) team since 2014. Gaelic footballer Stefan Okunbor was recruited to the club from Ireland as a Category B rookie, and was joined by Blake Schlensog, a graduate from Geelong's "Next Generation Academy".

Statistics 
Geelong utilised 34 players from their playing list this season; of these players, five played in their first AFL game: Tom Atkins, Jordan Clark, Charlie Constable, Darcy Fort and Gryan Miers. Additionally, Luke Dahlhaus and Gary Rohan played their first games for the Cats, having previously played for Western Bulldogs and Sydney respectively. There was four players who played in all 25 of the club's games. Tom Hawkins was the club's leading goalkicker for the eighth successive season, scoring 56 goals.

Season summary 

The fixture for the 2019 season was confirmed by the AFL in November 2018, with clubs playing 22 matches during the regular season and receiving a mid-season bye. Geelong participated in the 2019 JLT Community Series as part of their pre-season schedule, playing in two games against West Coast and Essendon.

Geelong began the regular season on 22 March against Collingwood at the MCG; despite featuring six new players in their team lineup, the Cats narrowly won the game by seven points. This successful start to the season continued the following week, with Geelong winning against Melbourne by 80 points; both Collingwood and Melbourne reached the preliminary finals in the previous season. After an away win against Adelaide in round 3, the Cats recorded their first loss for the season against Greater Western Sydney the next week. Playing against arch-rival Hawthorn on Easter Monday, Geelong overcame match-day injuries to midfielder Brandan Parfitt and ruckman Esava Ratugolea to post a 23-point win. This was the first of eight consecutive wins for the Cats, including a 58-point victory over reigning premier West Coast in round 6. Geelong's score of 21.7 (133) against Western Bulldogs in round 9 was their highest of the season, with the Cats recording eleven individual goalkickers in their win. Travelling to the MCG again in round 12, the Cats defeated Richmond by 67 points; the Tigers had won 26 of their 28 previous games at the venue.

The Cats' early season success was somewhat marred by a string of on-field incidents by Cats' player Gary Ablett, beginning when Ablett was offered a one-match suspension for striking Essendon midfielder Dylan Shiel with a forearm to the head in the Cats' round 7 win. After successfully appealing the suspension at the AFL Tribunal, Ablett was involved in an almost identical incident the following week with North Melbourne's Sam Wright, but was not penalised. A fortnight later, Ablett was suspended for the first time in his 331-game career when he accepted a one-match suspension for punching the jaw of Gold Coast midfielder Anthony Miles. Heading into their bye in round 13, Geelong were placed first on the league's ladder with an 11–1 win–loss record; notably the Cats had played each team that had qualified for the previous season's final series.

Geelong were defeated by Port Adelaide in their first match following their week off; it was the eighth consecutive year the Cats had lost after a mid-season bye. This loss began a pattern where Geelong failed to record successive wins for the remainder of the home-and-away season, winning just five of ten matches. All but one of the Cats' wins was at GMHBA Stadium; their sole away victory was against Sydney at the Sydney Cricket Ground in round 19, with Tom Hawkins scoring five goals in his 250th game. Despite this inconsistent form, the Cats's still finished the regular season with a 16–6 win–loss record and placed first on the league's ladder, qualifying for the 2019 finals series and earning Geelong their first minor premiership since the 2008 season.

Leading up to the finals series, Geelong had won just three of their 12 finals since their premiership win in 2011. Geelong continued this poor finals form in their qualifying final against Collingwood, losing by 10 points. Geelong defeated West Coast by 20 points in the following week's semi-final, progressing to the third week of the finals series as a result. Geelong were subsequently defeated in a preliminary final against Richmond by 19 points, eliminating them before the 2019 AFL Grand Final. It was the first time since the introduction of the final eight system that both of the regular season's top-two teams failed to reach the Grand Final, after second-placed Brisbane lost their semi-final against Greater Western Sydney.

Results

Ladder

Reserves team 
The club's reserves team, participating in the VFL, was coached by Shane O'Bree for a fourth season. Aaron Black and James Tsitas were appointed co-captains, replacing Tom Atkins after he was rookie-listed in the senior team.

The reserves team finished the regular season with a 11–7 win–loss record and placed sixth on the league's ladder, qualifying for the finals series as a result. Geelong was subsequently defeated in an elimination final by Port Melbourne.

Awards 

Geelong held their player awards night at Crown Palladium on 3 October, with former player Doug Wade presenting the club's best and fairest award, the Carji Greeves Medal. The award was won by Patrick Dangerfield, who received 268 votes; runner-up  Tim Kelly polled 259.5 votes, with Tom Stewart in third place on 151 votes. It was Dangerfield's third Carji Greeves Medal, having previously won the award in 2016 and 2017. Additionally, Scott Selwood received the Tom Harley Award, for best representing the club's values, and Tom Hawkins was presented with the Community Champion award. Gryan Miers was named the club's Best Young Player.

Dangerfield, Kelly, Hawkins and Stewart were all selected in the honorary 2019 All-Australian team. Teammates Gary Ablett and Mark Blicavs were initially shortlisted but ultimately not selected in the final team. Kelly also received the AFL Coaches Association's Best Young Player award. Geelong had three players, Charlie Constable (round two), Miers (round eight) and Jordan Clark (round fifteen), who were nominated for the season's Rising Star award.

See also 
2019 Geelong Football Club women's season

Notes

References

External links 
 Official website of the Geelong Football Club
 Official website of the Australian Football League

2019
Geelong Football Club